Sir Frederic John Wrottesley (20 March 1880 – 14 November 1948) was a British lawyer and judge.

Wrottesley was educated at Tonbridge School and Lincoln College, Oxford, where he read Mods and Greats. He was called to the bar by the Inner Temple in 1907, and practised at the parliamentary bar. During World War I, he served with the Royal Field Artillery, reaching the rank of major and being mentioned in despatches.

He took silk in 1926 and became Recorder of Wolverhampton in 1930.

He was appointed to the King's Bench Division of the High Court in 1937, receiving the customary knighthood the same year. In 1947 he was made a Lord Justice of Appeal and appointed to the Privy Council, but was forced to retire in 1948 for health reasons.

References

External links 

 

1880 births
1948 deaths
People educated at Tonbridge School
Alumni of Lincoln College, Oxford
Members of the Inner Temple
Royal Field Artillery officers
Lords Justices of Appeal
Knights Bachelor
Members of the Privy Council of the United Kingdom
Queen's Bench Division judges